Anthony Joseph Poeta (March 4, 1933 – May 2, 2004) was a professional ice hockey player from 1950 to 1960.

Poeta played for teams in the National Hockey League, Ontario Hockey Association, American Hockey League, International Hockey League, QHL, Northern Ontario Hockey Association, EOHL, and the European Hockey League.

He only played one game in the NHL and that was with the Chicago Black Hawks. In that one game he scored no goals, earned no assists for no points. He also had no penalty minutes.

Poeta played for the World Champion Belleville McFarlands in 1959.

Teams
 Galt Black Hawks from 1950 to 1952
 Chicago Black Hawks for the 1951–52 NHL season.
 Galt/Barrie Flyers from 1952 to 1953
 Cleveland Barons from 1953 to 1954
 Marion Barons from 1953 to 1954
 Valleyfield Braves from 1954 to 1955
 North Bay Trappers from 1954 to 1956, and 1957 to 1959
 Stratford Indians from 1955 to 1956
 Belleville McFarlands from 1957 to 1958
 Greensboro Generals / Johnstown Jets from 1959 to 1960
 Milwaukee Falcons from 1959 to 1960

See also
List of players who played only one game in the NHL

External links
 

1933 births
2004 deaths
Barrie Flyers players
Canadian ice hockey right wingers
Chicago Blackhawks players
Cleveland Barons (1937–1973) players
Galt Black Hawks players
Greensboro Generals (EHL) players
Sportspeople from North Bay, Ontario
Marion Barons players
Milwaukee Falcons players
Ice hockey people from Ontario